Daksa may refer to:

 Daksha in Hinduism,
 Daksa (island), small island near Dubrovnik, Croatia.